The team fixed small bird event was part of the archery programme at the 1920 Summer Olympics.  The event, like all other archery events in 1920, was open only to men.  One team of six archers from Belgium competed.

Two events, an individual and a team event, were contested.  Each archer shot only once, with individual scores being summed to give a team score.  The top three scores for each team were used to determine placings, though all six members of the team were considered medalists.

Results

References

Sources
 
 

Archery at the 1920 Summer Olympics